A yak is a long-haired species of cattle. There are two types of yak:
 Domestic yak (Bos grunniens)
 Wild yak (Bos mutus)

Yak may also refer to:

 Yak (band), an English rock band
 YAK (cryptography) is a public-key authenticated key agreement protocol
 Yak (Thailand), a mythical ogre of the Yasha kind
 Yak (instrument), a type of flute
 "Yak", English game designer Jeff Minter
 "The Yak", Nigerian footballer Yakubu
 Yakovlev or Yak Aircraft Corporation, or numerous aircraft designed or manufactured by this company
 Rheinmetall MAN Military Vehicles YAK, an armoured transport vehicle
 Yak-B 12.7mm machine gun, a Russian .50 caliber four-barrel gatling gun
 Yak Peak, a mountain in British Columbia, Canada
 A member of a yakuza organization
 IATA airport code for Yakutat Airport in Yakutat, Alaska

See also
 
 
 Yacc, a computer program that generates parsers
 Yake (disambiguation)
 Yaksa (disambiguation)
 Yuck (disambiguation), various meanings, primarily as a sound of disgust